Kilcock is a Gaelic Athletic Association (GAA) club in Kilcock, County Kildare, Ireland, winner of five Kildare Senior Football Championship:  (1914, 1917, 1955, 1957, 1958) and Kildare club of the year in 1982. Located on the border with County Meath, Kilcock has a long and proud tradition of Gaelic Games. Traditionally Kilcock draws it players from the village itself as well as the surrounding rural areas of Laragh, Ballycaghan, Clonfert and Belgard.
Kilcock is the home of Davy Dalton Jr., winner of the 1997 All Stars Award.

History
Kilcock GAA began life as Kilcock O’Connell's and was one of the strongest early GAA clubs in Kildare. Christy Rochfort was a prominent footballer and referee of the early years. Six Kilcock men have won All Ireland Senior Football Championships with Kildare (1905, 1919).

Kilcock won their first Senior Football Championship in 1914 beating Clane GAA 1–4 to 0–4. Kilcock repeated this success in 1917 beating Kilcullen GAA by 5–0 to 2–1.

The 1950s was a glorious decade for Kilcock. Winning the Junior A and overall Junior championship of 1950, the club secured promotion to the senior ranks in 1953 and won the Leader Cup (Division One League) the same year. This was followed by Senior Football Championship titles in 1955, 1957 and 1958.

Kilcock last won the Kildare Senior Football Championship in 1958 when they defeated Round Towers GAA (Kildare) on a scoreline of 3–12 to 3–8. On each occasion, the Kilcock team was welcomed home to the Fair Green in the village where it is said that the porter flowed uninterrupted for days on end and the bonfires burned long into the night.

The 1960s saw Kilcock decline as a senior power. Relegation to intermediate level in 1968 was a blow to the club, however, the spell at intermediate level was short-lived as the club went on to win the Intermediate Championship in 1969.

1970 saw the formal unification of Kilcock and Cappagh GAA as a senior team. As both clubs come from the same parish and often draw players from the same areas it was felt that such an amalgamation would benefit all within the parish of Kilcock & Newtown. However this amalgamation did not last long and when Cappagh acquired their own field in Ballyvoneen in May 1971, both clubs went their separate ways. After the break-up, Kilcock was re-graded to Junior A and football was to languish in the doldrums for the rest of the decade.

The 1970s was largely a forgettable period for the club, the highlight being a Junior B championship final appearance in 1979. Also in 1979, the club moved from the Bawnog to Branganstown. After nearly 90 years playing at the Bawnog, there was much sadness after the club played its final game there however the opportunity to play on better land in Branganstown was too good an opportunity to turn down.

In 1981 the club was successful, winning both Junior B and Junior C and defeated Naas to claim the Jack Higgins cup. In 1982 Kilcock won the Intermediate championship. Kilcock competed at the senior level for 18 years before finally in 2000 making a major breakthrough as we made it to the SFC Final under the guidance of Willie Hughes where it came second against a Cian O'Neill-inspired Moorefield GAA. Under the management of Bobby Miller, 2003 was another good year for the club as the senior footballers captured the SFL Division 1 title, while also reaching the SFC final again, losing to Round Towers GAA (Kildare).

The recession hit the town of Kilcock hard and between 2009 and 2011 there was a mass exodus of footballers from the club. This, combined with a number of years where underage success was a rarity led to Kilcock being relegated back to the Intermediate level in 2011. 

Hurling and camogie have had something of a resurgence in Kilcock in recent years with success at both underage and adult level in both sports. Under the guidance of Trevor Cummings, Kilcock won the Kildare Junior Hurling Championship in 2018 and a week later, won the promotion/relegation playoff against Celbridge to seal Intermediate status for 2019. Kilcock's camogie team won back-to-back Kildare Junior Camogie titles is 2017 and 2018, and reached the Kildare Intermediate final in their first year playing at the level in 2019, where they fell to neighbours Cappagh GAA by a single point.

Kilcock will return to the Senior Ranks of Kildare Club football in 2022 after an impressive replay win over Ballymore Eustace the full time score ending Kilcock 1-16 to 0-7 for Ballymore Eustace  in the 2021 IFC Final. In the same year both the Kilcock Ladies Football and  Camogie teams won their respective Kildare Intermediate Championships, with the footballers beating Kilcullen by 4-06 to 1-13 and the camogie team defeating St. Laurences by a scoreline of 0-06 to 0-05.

Honors
Davy Dalton Sr. was captain of the Kildare team who won the 1956 Leinster Championship. He was joined on that team by Larry McCormack, Paddy Gibbons and Noel Moran. Larry McCormack captained the Leinster Railway Cup Team in 1957. He also went on to play for Ireland in the same year against a Combined Universities team. He lined out at centre half forward that day.

Davy Dalton Jr. was chosen on the Kildare football team of the millennium at cornerback. He was the winner of the All Stars Award in 1997. He received 4 All Stars nominations and Kildare footballer of the year in 1990 and 1991.

Notable players
 Tommy Kelly(1905 All Ireland Snr Football Championship winner)
 Tom Crowley (1905 All Ireland Snr Football Championship winner)
 James 'Ginger' Moran (1919 All Ireland Snr Football Championship winner)
 Kit Flynn (1919 All Ireland Snr Football Championship winner)
 Joe Connor (1919 All Ireland Snr Football Championship winner)
 George Magan (1919 All Ireland Snr Football Championship winner)
 Davy Dalton Sr (1956 Leinster Snr Football Championship winner)
 Larry McCormack (1956 Leinster Snr Football Championship winner)
 Paddy Gibbons (1956 Leinster Snr Football Championship winner)
 Noel Moran (1956 Leinster Snr Football Championship winner)
 Davy Dalton Jr (1998 Leinster Snr Football Championship winner)

Roll of Honour
 Kildare Senior Football Championship: (5) 1914, 1917, 1955, 1957, 1958
 Kildare Senior Football League Division 1: (2) 1953, 2003
Kildare Intermediate Football Championship: (4)1938, 1969, 1982, 2021
 Kildare Junior Football Championship: (2) 1937, 1950
 Kildare Under 21 Football Championship: (1) 1999
 Kildare Intermediate Football League: (2)  1950, 1982,
 Kildare Junior B Football Championship: (1) 1981
 Kildare Junior C Football Championship: (1) 1981
  Aldridge Cup: (1) 2006
 Jack Higgins Cup: (1) 1981
 Kildare Under-21 Football Division 2 Championship: (1) 2015
 Kildare Minor Football Division 1 Championship: (1) 1995
 Kildare Minor Football Division 1 League: (2) 1956, 2016
 Kildare Minor Football Division 2 Championship: (1) 2011
 Kildare Minor Football Division 2 League: (2) 1980, 1981
 Kildare Under 16 Football Division 1 Championship: (1) 2010
 Kildare Under 14 Football Division 1 Championship: (2) 2002, 2012
 Kildare Under 13 Football Division 2 Championship: (3) 1975, 1982, 1985
 Kildare Under 11 Football Division 2 Championship: (3) 1977, 1984, 1985
 Kildare Under 10 Football Division 2 Championship: (1) 1983
 Kildare Under 9 Football Division 1 League: (1) 2000

Current officers
•	Cathaoirleach (Chairperson) - Ed Goodwin
•	Rúnaí (Secretary) - Ciara McNickle
•	Cisteoir (Treasurer) - Peter Divilly
•	Leas-Cathaoirleach (Vice-chairperson) - Liam Eves
•	Leas Cisteoir (Assistant Treasurer) - Tom Doherty
•	Public Relations Officer - Mark Durkan
•	Club Delegates - Brian Connaughton, Michael McGinley
•	Intermediate Football manager - Declan Gibbons
•	Reserve A Football manager - Donal Cummins
•	Intermediate Hurling manager: Trevor Cummings
•       Ladies Junior football manager: Martin Maguire
•       Intermediate Camogie Manager: Ciaran Heneghan

External links
Kilcock GAA site
Kildare GAA club sites

Kilcock Facebook page

Kilcock
Gaelic games clubs in County Kildare
Hurling clubs in County Kildare
Gaelic football clubs in County Kildare